Charles Kenneth Hall (born December 13, 1935) nicknamed "Sugar Land Express", is a former American football player. Playing for the Sugar Land High School Gators (Sugar Land, Texas) from 1950 to 1953, Hall established 17 national football records, several of which still stand.

High school
Hall's career prep rushing record of 11,232 yards (1950: 569 yd; 1951: 3,160 yd; 1952: 3,458 yd; 1953: 4,045 yd) stood until November 16, 2012, when it was broken by Derrick Henry. His 32.9 points per game (1953/12) remains a national record.  His record of 38 one hundred-yard games was tied by Steve Worster in 1966, but was not broken until the mid-1980s by Emmitt Smith, whose record was recently broken by Rushel Shell of Hopewell High School in Pennsylvania. Hall also finished his career with 14,558 yards of total offense (11,232 rushing/3,326 passing), a record that would last until being broken by Nitro (West Virginia) High School's  future Major League Baseball player J. R. House in 1998.

According to the National High School Sports Record Book, Hall still holds multiple single-season records, including average points per game (32.9), touchdowns per game (4.8) and rushing yards per game (337.1).

In a single contest against Houston Lutheran High School in 1953, Hall averaged 47.3 yards on 11 carries for 520 yards (the state record for nearly 25 years, currently 4th), returned a punt 82 yards, a kickoff run of 64 yards and snatched a 21-yard interception for a combined 687 total yards.

College
Hall was recruited by several schools, and chose to attend Texas A&M under college coach Paul "Bear" Bryant.
He quit before his college's team went to the Junction, Texas, training camp and got married.

Professional career
Hall played in the Canadian Football League and for various National Football League teams between 1957 and 1961. On October 23, 1960, Hall averaged  65.33 yards per kickoff return for the Houston Oilers against the New York Titans, 3rd highest on the all time individual NFL record books for highest average kickoff return yardage, game (minimum of at least three returns).

He played in 34 total games, serving as a half back and occasional punter. He rushed for 212 total career yards on 51 carries, with 8 receptions for 118 yards and 2 touchdowns. He returned 11 punt returns for 164 yards and a touchdown and he returned 31 kicks for 833 yards for one touchdown. He punted 14 times for 448 yards.

Legacy and honors
In 1983, Hall was placed in the National High School Hall of Fame. Hall also belongs to the Texas High School Football Hall of Fame and the Texas Sports Hall of Fame. Hall was honored, by All American Games, in 1999 with the creation of the Hall Trophy.  The Hall Trophy (molded in Hall's likeness) is presented annually to an outstanding football player on a nationwide level. Some past winners include Chris Leak, Adrian Peterson, Mitch Mustain, and Terrelle Pryor. During the 1980s, Hall was sales manager for Sweetner Products Company,  a large wholesale sugar distributor in Southern California. He lives in Fredericksburg, Texas.

Records
Fifty-five years later, Hall still holds the following Texas state records:

Single-season rushing yards (4,045/1953; this was accomplished in 12 games, and Hall remains the only Texas running back to rush for over 4,000 yards in one year)
Rushing per game (337.1 yards/1953/12)
Points per game (32.9/1953/12)
Career rushing (11,232 yards/1950–53)

See also
 U.S. Army Player of the Year Award
 John Giannantonio

References

External links

 Ken Hall Stadium
 

1935 births
Living people
People from Fredericksburg, Texas
People from Madisonville, Texas
Players of American football from Texas
American football running backs
Texas A&M Aggies football players
Baltimore Colts players
Chicago Cardinals players
Houston Oilers players
St. Louis Cardinals (football) players
American Football League players
American players of Canadian football
Canadian football running backs
Edmonton Elks players